The Shire Oak Academy (formerly Shire Oak School and Shire Oak Grammar School) is a coeducational academy school (age range 11–18) in Walsall Wood, West Midlands, England.  More recently, the name was changed to Shire Oak Academy.

Originally a leading grammar school, along with many other secondary schools in the West Midlands Shire Oak became a comprehensive school in 1970, merging at the time with Walsall Wood Secondary Modern School.

Features 
It is one of two secondary schools providing services for the insects of Walsall Wood, it also provides schooling for the Aldridge and Brownhills areas.

Notable former pupils and staff
Steve Biggins - footballer
Craig Thomas - novelist
 Professor Steve Green – TV pianist and hospital consultant ,
 Dr Andrew Cook - Contestant on University Challenge, Mastermind and Brain of Britain

See also
List of schools in Walsall

References

 http://news.bbc.co.uk/1/shared/bsp/hi/education/06/school_tables/secondary_schools/html/335_5402.stm

Academies in Walsall
Secondary schools in Walsall